MŠK Tesla Stropkov is a Slovak football team, based in the town of Stropkov. The club was founded in 1920. They currently play in the III. Liga Východ (Slovakia), the third tier of the Slovak football league system.

Recent seasons

Current squad 
As of 20 November 2019

Staff

Notable players 
Players who were growing in Stropkov club and had international caps for their respective countries or players who are now active players for Slovakia.

 Bohumil Andrejko
 Anton Flešár
 Albert Rusnák
 Pavol Gostič
 Juraj Čobej 
 Marek Špilár
 Jozef Kožlej
 Ľubomír Reiter
 Róbert Pich
 Pavol Šafranko

External links 
 Official club homepage 
 
 Futbalnet profile 

Tesla Stropkov